Photinia lanuginosa is a woody shrub species in the family Rosaceae. It is found only in the Hunan province of China.

References

lanuginosa

Maleae